This is a list of the 6 members of the European Parliament for Luxembourg in the 1979 to 1984 session.

List

Party representation

Notes

Luxembourg
List
1979